Kızılçukur is a village in Tarsus district of Mersin Province, Turkey. It is situated in the southern slopes of the Toros Mountains. The population of Kırıt was 329  as of 2012.

References

Villages in Tarsus District